Palm wine, known by several local names, is an alcoholic beverage created from the sap of various species of palm tree such as the palmyra, date palms, and coconut palms. It is known by various names in different regions and is common in various parts of Africa, the Caribbean, South America, South Asia, Southeast Asia and Micronesia.

Palm wine production by smallholders and individual farmers may promote conservation as palm trees become a source of regular household income that may economically be worth more than the value of timber sold.

Tapping

The sap is extracted and collected by a tapper.  Typically the sap is collected from the cut flower of the palm tree. A container is fastened to the flower stump to collect the sap.  The white liquid that initially collects tends to be very sweet and non-alcoholic before it is fermented.  An alternative method is the felling of the entire tree.  Where this is practised, a fire is sometimes lit at the cut end to facilitate the collection of sap.

Palm sap begins fermenting immediately after collection, due to natural yeasts in the air (often spurred by residual yeast left in the collecting container). Within two hours, fermentation yields an aromatic wine of up to 4% alcohol content, mildly intoxicating and sweet. The wine may be allowed to ferment longer, up to a day, to yield a stronger, more sour and acidic taste, which some people prefer. Longer fermentation produces vinegar instead of stronger wine.

Distilled
Palm wine may be distilled to create a stronger drink, which goes by different names depending on the region (e.g., arrack, palm feni (liquor), sopi, village gin, charayam, and country whiskey).

Throughout Nigeria, this is commonly called palm wine. In some parts of Cameroon, it is known as Emu or "Matango". In parts of southern Ghana, distilled palm wine is called akpeteshi or burukutu.  In Togo and Benin, it is called sodabe, while in Tunisia it is called lagmi. In coastal parts of Kenya, it is known as "mnazi". In India it is called "toddy". In Ivory Coast, it is called "koutoukou".

In the Philippines, the most common distilled palm liquor is lambanog which is made from aged tubâ. It has very high alcohol by volume, at 40 to 45% abv (80 to 90 proof).

Consumption by region

Africa

In Africa, the sap used to create palm wine is most often taken from wild datepalms such as the silver date palm (Phoenix sylvestris), the palmyra, and the jaggery palm (Caryota urens), or from oil palm such as the African Oil Palm (Elaeis guineense) or from Raffia palms, kithul palms, or nipa palms. In part of central and western Democratic Republic of the Congo, palm wine is called malafu. 

Palm wine plays an important role in many ceremonies in many tribes and nations of Nigeria such as among the Igbo and Yoruba peoples, and elsewhere in Central and Western Africa. Guests at weddings, birth celebrations, funerals and gatherings to observe important festivals and holidays are served generous quantities. Palm wine is often infused with medicinal herbs to remedy a wide variety of physical complaints. As a token of respect to deceased ancestors, many drinking sessions begin with a small amount of palm wine spilled on the ground (Kulosa malafu in Kikongo ya Leta). Palm wine is enjoyed by men and women, although women usually drink it in less public venues.

In parts of southeastern Nigeria, namely Igboland, palm wine is locally referred to as "mmanya ocha" (literally, "white drink"), with "ngwo" and "nkwu" variants. It plays a very important role in traditional Igbo settings. In Urualla, for instance, and other "ideator" towns, it is the drink of choice for traditional weddings. A young man who is going for the first introduction at his in-laws’ house is required to bring palm wine with him. There are varying gallons of palm wine required, depending on the customs of the different regions in Igboland. This culture can be observed in a similar fashion in the neighboring north-western regions of Cameroon. (North West Region).

There are four types of palm wine in the central and southern Democratic Republic of the Congo. From the oil palm comes ngasi, dibondo comes from the raffia palm, cocoti from the coconut palm, and mahusu from a short palm which grows in the savannah areas of western Bandundu and Kasai provinces.

South Asia

In South Asian countries such as Bangladesh, India, and Sri Lanka, coconut palms and Palmyra palms such as the Arecaceae and Borassus are preferred. It is mainly produced from the lala palm (Hyphaene coriacea) by cutting the stem and collecting the sap. In some areas of India, palm wine is evaporated to produce the unrefined sugar called jaggery.

In parts of India, the unfermented sap is called neera ( in Tamil Nadu) and is refrigerated, stored and distributed by semi-government agencies. A little lime (calcium hydroxide) is added to the sap to prevent it from fermenting. Neera, similar to fruit-juice products, is relatively rich in potassium.

Palm sap contains natural yeasts, which perform the fermentation of glucose to alcohol, as well as acetobacter, which subsequently converts the alcohol to acetic acid (vinegar). Optimal consumption time is one day after tapping when the vinegar content is minimal; beyond this time, it becomes increasingly sour. Some palm wine drinkers prefer their beverage more sour than usual, but fermenting for too long will result in vinegar rather than wine. Refrigeration extends beverage life, as do a variety of spices, which also contribute flavor.

In Tamil Nadu, this beverage is currently banned, though the legality fluctuates with politics. In the absence of legal toddy, moonshine distillers of arrack often sell methanol-contaminated alcohol, which can have lethal consequences. To discourage this practice, authorities have pushed for inexpensive "Indian Made Foreign Liquor" (IMFL).

In states of Telangana, Andhra Pradesh (India), toddy is a popular drink in rural parts that is frequently consumed at the end of the day after work.

People enjoy  right at the trees where it is brought down.

Toddy is mixed with rice dough and left overnight to aid in fermentation and expansion of the dough causing the dough to rise overnight, making the bread soft when prepared.

In Kerala, toddy is sold under a license issued by the excise department and it is an industry having more than 50,000 employees with a welfare board under the labor department. It is also used in the preparation of a soft variety of Sanna, which is famous in the parts of Karnataka and Goa in India.

Indonesia and Malaysia

Tuak, which can refer to both palm wine and rice wine, is imbibed in Sumatra, Sulawesi, Kalimantan and Bali of Indonesia and parts of Malaysia such as Sabah and Sarawak in East Malaysia. The beverage is a popular drink among the Kadazan-Dusun, Ibans and the Dayaks during the Gawai and Kaamatan festivals, weddings, hosting of guests and other special occasions. The Batak people of North Sumatra also consume palm wine, with the palm sap is mixed with raru bark to make Tuak. The brew is served at stalls along with snacks. The same word is used for other drinks in Indonesia, for example, those made using fermented rice.

Mexico

Mexican tuba made from coconut sap is common in western Mexico, especially in the states of Colima, Jalisco, Michoacán, and Guerrero. Coconuts are not native to the Americas. They were introduced to Mexico from the Philippines via the Manila Galleons to Acapulco, along with tuba manufacturing. Mexican tuba is made in the same way as Filipino tubâ. The traditional sap collectors are known as tuberos (which also means "plumber" in both Mexico and the Philippines). It became so popular that in 1619, Captain Sebastian de Piñeda wrote to King Philip III of Spain complaining of the Filipino "Indio" settlers in Nueva España who were causing significant loss of profits to Iberian alcohol exporters due to tuba.

Mexican tuba is also commonly sold as tuba fresca, a non-alcoholic version made from fresh coconut sap. It is traditionally sold by street vendors in large bottle gourds mixed with coconut milk, ice, and sugar. It is usually topped with peanuts and diced fruit.

Philippines

Palm wines are widely consumed in the Philippines and are part of the traditional palm vinegar industry. They are gathered mostly from coconuts, nipa palms, or kaong palms. Palm wines fermented for a few days to a few weeks are generally referred to as tubâ. There are two notable traditional derivations of tubâ with higher alcohol contents. The first are distilled liquor, generally known as lambanog (coconut) and laksoy (nipa palm). They are milky white to clear in colour. The second is the bahalina which is typically deep brown-orange in colour due to the use of bark extracts from the mangrove Ceriops tagal.

Other types of palm wines indigenous to the islands include subtypes of tubâ like tuhak or tubâ sa hidikup which is made from kaong palm sap, and tunggang which is made from fishtail palm sap.

On the island of Leyte in the central Philippines, the red tubâ is aged with the tanbark for up to six months to two years, until it gets dark red and tapping its glass container gives off a deep hollow sound. This type of tubâ is called bahal (for tubâ aged this way for up to six months) and bahalina (for tubâ aged thus for up to a year or more).

South America
Production of palm wine may have contributed to the endangered status of the Chilean wine palm (Jubaea chilensis).

Other areas
In Tuvalu, the process of making toddy can clearly be seen with tapped palm trees that line Funafuti International Airport.
In Kiribati, it is called Karewe and freshly tapped sap from coconut spathe is used as a refreshing drink and the fermented sap is used as an alcoholic beverage. Karewe is boiled to reduce into a thick light brown liquid, called kamwaimwai, used as sweetener and spread.

Consumption by animals
Some small pollinating mammals consume large amounts of fermented palm nectar as part of their diet, especially the southeast Asian pen-tailed treeshrew. The inflorescences of the bertam palm contain populations of yeast which ferment the nectar in the flowers to up to 3.8% alcohol (average: 0.6%). The treeshrews metabolise the alcohol very efficiently and do not appear to become drunk from the fermented nectar.

Megabats have been known to drink from containers of harvested palm sap and then urinate into the containers, leading to the transmission of the Nipah virus.

Names
There are a variety of regional names for Palm wine:

Gallery

In popular culture
The tapping and consumption of palm wine are recurrent motifs in the Chinua Achebe novel Things Fall Apart, and in the Amos Tutuola novel The Palm-Wine Drinkard. It is also mentioned in the 2006 movie Blood Diamond.

See also

 Arrack, an alcoholic beverage distilled from coconut palm wine in southeast Asia.
 Coyol wine
 Desi daru
 Madurai Veeran, a deity who consumes toddy.
 Ogogoro
 Palm-wine music, a West African musical genre.
 Pulque
 Sree Muthappan, another deity who consumes toddy.
 List of Indonesian beverages

References
Notes

External links
 
 Article on Philippine palm wine

Palm wine